Michael Wayne Hopkins (born March 6, 1960) is an American former college basketball player and coach.

Hopkins played collegiately for the Coastal Carolina Chanticleers between 1989 and 1993. He was an assistant coach for three college programs from 1998 to 1994. He was head coach of the Chanticleers from 1994 to 1998 and compiled a 30–76 overall record. He subsequently was an assistant coach with The Citadel from 1999 to 2002, then took the same role at Virginia Tech for the 2002–03 season.

Head coaching record

References

1960 births
Living people
American men's basketball coaches
American men's basketball players
Basketball coaches from South Carolina
Basketball players from Columbia, South Carolina
The Citadel Bulldogs basketball coaches
Coastal Carolina Chanticleers men's basketball coaches
Coastal Carolina Chanticleers men's basketball players
East Carolina Pirates men's basketball coaches
High school basketball coaches in the United States
Sportspeople from Columbia, South Carolina
USC Aiken Pacers men's basketball coaches
Virginia Tech Hokies men's basketball coaches
Western Carolina Catamounts men's basketball coaches